The 1970 Magyar Kupa (English: Hungarian Cup) was the 31st season of Hungary's annual knock-out cup football competition.

Final

See also
 1970 Nemzeti Bajnokság I

References

External links
 Official site 
 soccerway.com

1970–71 in Hungarian football
1970–71 domestic association football cups
1970